Goulais Bay 15A is a First Nations reserve in Algoma District, Ontario, Canada. It lies on Goulais Bay (of Lake Superior), encompassing most of the unincorporated community of Goulais Mission, and is one of the reserves of the Batchewana First Nation of Ojibways.

History

This area has been a centre for the lake whitefish fishery since time immemorial. After the expropriation of Whitefish Island from the First Nation in 1902, most residents were forced to move to Goulais Mission. On 8 January 1979, the band council paid the Crown $365.20 to purchase 6.47 km2 of land in and around Goulais Mission. It encompasses all of Goulais Mission, except for three parcels of waterfront property. One of these parcels of land is owned by the Roman Catholic Church and houses The Lady of Sorrows church, built by Bishop Kohler around 1860.

External links
 Aboriginal Affairs and Northern Development Canada profile

References

Ojibwe reserves in Ontario
Communities in Algoma District